Adrian Krainer may refer to:
 Adrian Krainer (snowboarder)
 Adrian Krainer (scientist)